Mill Plain is a census-designated place (CDP) in the town of Fairfield, Fairfield County, Connecticut, United States. It is in the southern part of the town, directly north of the downtown area of Fairfield and northeast of Southport. It is bordered to the west by the Mill River, to the south by Interstate 95, to the east by Mill Plain Road, and to the north by Duck Farm Road.

Mill Plain was first listed as a CDP prior to the 2020 census.

References 

Census-designated places in Fairfield County, Connecticut
Census-designated places in Connecticut